Lawton–Bronson Community School District is a rural public school district in Iowa. It has two schools: Lawton–Bronson Elementary School in Bronson and Lawton–Bronson Jr./Sr. High School in Lawton.

Almost all of the district is in Woodbury County, with a small part in Plymouth County.

The school mascot is the Eagles, and the colors are black and yellow.

History
The district was established on July 1, 1966, by the merger of the Lawton and Bronson districts; the latter was an elementary-only district.

Lawton–Bronson Junior/Senior High School

Athletics
The Eagles compete in the Western Valley Activities Conference in the following sports:
Cross country
Volleyball
Football
Basketball
Wrestling
Track and field
 Boys' 1991 Class 1A State Champions
Golf
Baseball
Softball

See also
List of school districts in Iowa
List of high schools in Iowa

References

External links
 Lawton–Bronson Community School District
 

School districts in Iowa
Education in Plymouth County, Iowa
Education in Woodbury County, Iowa
1966 establishments in Iowa
School districts established in 1966